Krokus are a Swiss hard rock band from Solothurn. Formed in 1974, the group originally consisted of lead vocalist Peter Richard, guitarist Tommy Kiefer, bassist Remo Spadino and drummer Chris von Rohr. By the time of the release of their self-titled debut album, Kiefer and von Rohr had taken over lead vocal duties. The band's current lineup features von Rohr on bass, keyboards and backing vocals (1974–1983, 1987–1989, and since 2008), lead vocalist Marc Storace (1979–1988, 1994–1999, and since 2002), lead guitarist Mandy Meyer (1980–1982, 2004–2008, and since 2012), rhythm guitarist Dominique Favez (2003–2008 and since 2014), and drummer Flavio Mezzodi (since 2013).

History

1974–1983
Krokus were formed in 1974 by guitarist Tommy Kiefer and drummer Chris von Rohr. The original lineup also included vocalist Peter Richard and bassist Remo Spadino. Richard left shortly after the band's first live show in 1975, at which point Kiefer took over primary lead vocal duties and Hansi Droz was brought in as a second guitarist. After the release of the group's self-titled debut album, Daniel Debritt briefly took over on lead vocals, but had left before the end of the year. Kiefer and von Rohr subsequently dismissed Droz and Spadino, and rebuilt the band by adding all three members of local trio Montezuma – Fernando von Arb on guitar, Jürg Naegeli on bass and Freddy "Steady" Frutig on drums, with von Rohr taking over lead vocals and keyboards. To You All and Pain Killer followed in 1977 and 1978.

For the tour in promotion of Pain Killer, Henry Friez was brought in to take over on lead vocals, with von Rohr switching to bass and Naegeli focusing on keyboards and live mixing. In late 1979, Friez was replaced by Marc Storace, who debuted on the 1980 release Metal Rendez-vous. During the album's promotional tour, Kiefer was temporarily replaced by Mandy Meyer. Shortly after the release of Hardware early the next year, the guitarist left permanently due to an ongoing heroin addiction, and Meyer remained as his replacement. By the beginning of 1982, however, Meyer had been left Switzerland to relocate to the United States and form Cobra, and was replaced in Krokus by Mark "Koki" Kohler. On 24 December 1986, Kiefer committed suicide by hanging after contracting AIDS around a year earlier.

After the release and promotion of 1982's One Vice at a Time, Freddy Steady left Krokus and was replaced by American drummer Steve Pace, the first non-European member of the group; when asked the following year about the lineup change, Storace claimed that it was made due to "musical direction and technical ability". Headhunter was released in 1983, and during the subsequent tour von Rohr became the last founding member to leave the band, when he was dismissed after giving "a tell-tale interview" to a Swiss newspaper regarding the band's drug-heavy touring lifestyle. With scheduled shows remaining on the tour, Kohler switched to bass and Patrick Mahassen briefly joined on rhythm guitar. At the end of the year, following the conclusion of the touring cycle, Mahassen was fired and Pace also left.

1984–2005
In preparation for the recording of The Blitz in 1984, Steve Pace was replaced by former Cobra drummer Jeff Klaven. Patrick Mahassen briefly returned during early sessions, but was fired again shortly thereafter and did not feature on the record. Upon the album's release, Andy Tanas took over on bass, allowing Mark Kohler to return to his original role of rhythm guitarist. Towards the end of The Blitz touring cycle, Tanas left due to "direction differences". Tommy Keiser, another former member of Cobra, took his place. The new lineup issued Change of Address in 1986, the tour for which spawned a live album, Alive and Screamin'.

In early 1987, Krokus parted ways with Keiser and Klaven, with frontman Mark Storace claiming that the former "just wouldn't work hard enough and lacked the musical depth we were looking for", and that the latter had become "fed up with touring". They were replaced by the returning Chris von Rohr and former Killer drummer Dani Crivelli, respectively. Heart Attack was released the next year, however after the subsequent promotional tour it was announced in August 1988 that Storace had been dismissed from the group. Lead guitarist Fernando von Arb departed around the same time. Storace and von Arb were replaced by Björn Lodin of Baltimoore and Crivelli's former Killer bandmate Many Maurer, respectively, although by early the next year the group had disbanded entirely.

In early 1990, Fernando von Arb (on bass) formed a new lineup of Krokus with Maurer, lead vocalist Peter Tanner, rhythm guitarist Tony Castell and drummer Peter "Rabbit" Haas. The band issued Stampede and toured until 1991, before going on hiatus again when von Arb was diagnosed with lymphoma. In early 1994, von Arb (back on guitar) reformed Krokus yet again, retaining Maurer on bass and reuniting with vocalist Marc Storace, rhythm guitarist Mark Kohler and drummer Freddy Steady. The new lineup released To Rock or Not to Be and toured during 1995, before disbanding again due to various members' family commitments making it difficult to commit full-time.

In spring 1999, Fernando von Arb reformed Krokus for a third time, retaining Many Maurer on bass and adding lead vocalist Carl Sentance, rhythm guitarist Chris Lauper and former drummer Peter Haas. After the release of Round 13, Haas was replaced by Cliff Rodgers. After the first leg of the tour, Lauper, Maurer and Rodgers were replaced by Dave Stettler, Tony Castell and Marcel Kopp, respectively. The group continued touring until it was announced in April 2002 that former vocalist Marc Storace would be returning to the lineup. With his return, the frontman brought solo band members Dominique Favez on rhythm guitar and Patrick Aeby on drums to Krokus.

Since 2005
Following the release of Rock the Block and Fire and Gasoline Live, von Arb left Krokus in February 2005 for the first time since joining in 1976. The departure occurred after the guitarist developed tendonitis in his wrist, although Storace claimed at the time that he "basically did not want to tour". von Arb was replaced by former guitarist Mandy Meyer. In November, Aeby also left the band. He was replaced in January 2006 by Stefan Schwarzmann, formerly of U.D.O., Accept and Helloween. The new lineup released Hellraiser in 2006 and toured until February 2008, when it was announced that the band would be taking "an artistic break".

In April 2008, it was announced that guitarist Fernando von Arb, bassist Chris von Rohr and drummer Freddy Steady had all returned to Krokus. Rhythm guitarist Mark Kohler followed in May, marking a reunion of the One Vice at a Time (1982) lineup. The band released Hoodoo in 2010, before Steady left in May 2011. He was replaced by Unisonic and Pink Cream 69 drummer Kosta Zafiriou, who was credited as a backup musician rather than an official member. In December 2012, the group expanded to a three-guitarist lineup for the first time when Mandy Meyer returned again. Dirty Dynamite was released in March 2013. Helloween drummer Dani Löble took over for a few shows in May 2013, before Flavio Mezzodi joined as a full-time member the same month.

During 2014 and 2015, Dominique Favez toured with Krokus in place of von Arb and Kohler, who were unable to tour. The band issued Big Rocks, a collection of cover versions, in January 2017.

Members

Current

Former

Timeline

Lineups

References

External links
Krokus official website

Krokus